Innes Gray (birth unknown) is an Irish former professional rugby league footballer who played in the 1990s. He played at representative level for Ireland, and at club level for Bangor Vikings.

International honours
Innes Gray won caps for Ireland while at Bangor Vikings 1998 2-caps (sub).

References

Living people
Bangor Vikings players
Ireland national rugby league team players
Irish rugby league players
Place of birth missing (living people)
Rugby league players from County Down
Year of birth missing (living people)